Mohammad Reza Khanzadeh (born 11 May 1991) is an Iranian footballer who plays for Bangladeshi club Bashundhara Kings as a defender. He is also last played in the Iran national football team.

Career

Rah Ahan
In 2009 Khanzadeh joined the Rah Ahan first team. Under the guidance of Ali Daei, Khanzadeh broke into the first team lineup late on in the season. He played in nine games, starting in eight and receiving two yellow cards.

Persepolis 
He signed a three-years contract with Persepolis on 2 June 2012. He made his debut for The Reds on 16 September 2012 while he used as a substitute against Naft Tehran. After playing good games for his side, fans called him Persepolis' Raphaël Varane.

Loan to Zob Ahan
He was loaned to Zob Ahan until the end of 2013–14 season on 18 November 2013. He made 15 league appearances for Zob Ahan before returning to Persepolis.

Return to Persepolis
Khanzadeh returned to Persepolis before the start of 2014–15 season after spending six months at Zob Ahan. On 22 April 2015 Khanzadeh and several team-mates were involved in an altercation with a Persepolis fan in Doha after Persepolis' 3–0 loss to Lekhwiya in the 2015 AFC Champions League. On 28 April 2015 the Iranian Football Disciplinary Committee banned Khanzadeh from competing in any competitive matches in Iran for nine months, but he was allowed to continue to train with Persepolis.

Foolad & Siah Jamegan 
Khanzadeh joined to Foolad before the start of 2015–16 season and after a season was sold to Siah Jamegan.

Padideh 
Khanzadeh signed a two-years contract with Padideh before the start of 2017–18. He scored 4 goals during his first season on the team.

International career

Youth
He was called to the Iran U23 team for AFC U-22 Asian Cup qualification by coach Alireza Mansourian. He named in Iran U23 final list for Incheon 2014.

Senior
He was called up by Carlos Queiroz for the Team Meli training camp in Turkey and the match against Albania in May 2012; however, he did not play in the match. He was selected in Iran's 30-man provisional squad for the 2014 FIFA World Cup by Carlos Queiroz. He was a stand-by player for Team Melli in the tournament. Khanzadeh was not selected in Iran's final squad for 2015 AFC Asian Cup. However, he was subsequently named as the replacement for the injured Hashem Beikzadeh. In May 2018 he was named in Iran's preliminary squad for the 2018 FIFA World Cup in Russia.

Career statistics

International
Statistics accurate as of match played 24 December 2018.

International goals
Scores and results list Iran's goal tally first.

Honours
Persepolis
Hazfi Cup runner-up: 2012–13

Tractor
Hazfi Cup: 2019–20

References

External links

Mohammad Reza Khanzadeh at PersianLeague.com

FFIRI profile

1992 births
Living people
Iranian footballers
Sportspeople from Tehran
Association football defenders
Rah Ahan players
Persepolis F.C. players
Zob Ahan Esfahan F.C. players
Foolad FC players
Siah Jamegan players
Shahr Khodro F.C. players
Al Ahli SC (Doha) players
Tractor S.C. players
Persian Gulf Pro League players
Qatar Stars League players
Iran under-20 international footballers
Iran international footballers
2015 AFC Asian Cup players
Footballers at the 2014 Asian Games
2018 FIFA World Cup players
Iranian expatriate footballers
Iranian expatriate sportspeople in Qatar
Expatriate footballers in Qatar
Iranian expatriates in Qatar
Asian Games competitors for Iran